Eusebius Amort (November 15, 1692February 5, 1775) was a German Roman Catholic theologian.

Life
Amort was born at Bibermuhle, near Tolz, in Upper Bavaria.  He studied at Munich, and at an early age joined the Canons Regular at Polling, where, shortly after his ordination in 1717, he taught theology and philosophy.
The Parnassus Boicus learned society was based on a plan started in 1720 by three Augustinian fathers: Eusebius Amort, Gelasius Hieber (1671–1731), a famous preacher in the German language and Agnellus Kandler (1692–1745), a genealogist and librarian. The initial plans fell through, but in 1722 they issued the first volume of the Parnassus Boicus journal, communicating interesting information from the arts and sciences.

In 1733 Amort went to Rome as theologian to Cardinal Niccolo Maria Lercari (died 1757).
He returned to Polling in 1735 and devoted the rest of his life to the revival of learning in Bavaria.  He died at Polling in 1775.

Works
Amort, who had the reputation of being the most learned man of his age, was a voluminous writer on every conceivable subject, from poetry to astronomy, from dogmatic theology to mysticism.  His best known works are:

A manual of theology in 4 vols, Theologia eclectica, moralis et scholastica (Augsburg, 1752; revised by Pope Benedict XIV for the 1753 edition published at Bologna)
A defence of Catholic doctrine, entitled Demonstratio critica religionis Catholicae (Augsburg, 1751)
A work on indulgences, which has often been criticized by Protestant writers, De Origine, Progressu, Valore, et Fructu Indulgentiorum (Augsburg, 1735)
A treatise on mysticism, De Revelationibus et Visionibus, etc. (2 vols, 1744)
The astronomical work Nova philosophiae planetarum et artis criticae systemata (Nuremberg, 1723).

The list of his other works, including his three erudite contributions to the question of authorship of the Imitatio Christi, will be found in C. Toussaint's scholarly article in Alfred Vacant's Dictionnaire de theologie (1900, cols 1115-1117).

References
Citations

Sources

1692 births
1775 deaths
18th-century German Catholic theologians
German male non-fiction writers
18th-century German writers
18th-century German male writers